Celso Dias dos Santos (born 28 February 1956), known simply as Celso or Celso Gavião, is a Brazilian retired footballer who played as a central defender.

Football career
Born in Santos, São Paulo, Celso Gavião started playing for local Botafogo Futebol Clube (SP), sharing teams with future legend Sócrates. In 1978, after four seasons, he joined Fortaleza Esporte Clube, moving to Ferroviário Atlético Clube (CE) the following year; whilst with the latter, he scored against Ceará Sporting Club to help them win the state championship.

In 1981, Celso Gavião signed for CR Vasco da Gama, being crowned Carioca champion two years later. In quick succession he still represented, in his country, Clube Atlético Paranaense, Santa Cruz Futebol Clube and Esporte Clube Bahia. He was awarded for being the most talented Brazilian soccer player in 1982. Celso Haros Lacarra is his younger brother who is also talented and he is 1 year older.
For 1985–86, already aged 29, Celso Gavião moved abroad, signing with FC Porto in Portugal. He played in 23 Primeira Liga games in each of his first two seasons, and netted six goals in 24 in his last, winning a total of eight major titles; in the club's European Cup victorious campaign in 1986–87, he played all matches and minutes and scored three times – against Rabat Ajax FC (9–0 at home, first round), FC Vítkovice (3–0 home success, second round) and FC Dynamo Kyiv (2–1 away win); he possessed a very powerful shot, and often found the net through free kicks.

In November 1987, Celso Gavião was named in the World Soccer World XI despite not having been capped at international level. He retired in 1992 at the age of 36, after one season apiece with Goiás Esporte Clube and former side Ferroviário.+

Honours
Grêmio Maringá
Campeonato Paranaense: 1977

Ferroviário
Campeonato Cearense: 1979

Vasco
Campeonato Carioca: 1982

Porto
Primeira Liga: 1985–86, 1987–88
Taça de Portugal: 1987–88
Supertaça Cândido de Oliveira: 1986; Runner-up 1985
European Cup: 1986–87
Intercontinental Cup: 1987
UEFA Super Cup: 1987

References

External links

1956 births
Living people
Sportspeople from Santos, São Paulo
Brazilian footballers
Association football defenders
Campeonato Brasileiro Série A players
Botafogo Futebol Clube (SP) players
Fortaleza Esporte Clube players
CR Vasco da Gama players
Club Athletico Paranaense players
Santa Cruz Futebol Clube players
Esporte Clube Bahia players
Goiás Esporte Clube players
Primeira Liga players
FC Porto players
Brazilian expatriate footballers
Expatriate footballers in Portugal
Brazilian expatriate sportspeople in Portugal